That's My Mama is an American television sitcom that was originally broadcast on the ABC network from September 4, 1974 until December 24, 1975. There are 39 episodes of this series. That's My Mama was never a ratings success, having always been beaten by NBC's Little House on the Prairie among other competing network programs. It was not one of the top 30 most-watched U.S. programs in the Nielsen ratings for either the 1974–1975 or 1975–1976 television seasons. As a result, the series ended on Christmas Eve of 1975. It was the first series to be produced by Columbia Pictures Television.

Synopsis
Set in a middle-class African American neighborhood in Washington, D.C., the program revolved around the character Clifton Curtis (played by Clifton Davis), a man in his mid-20s who worked as a barber at Oscar's Barber Shop, the family barber shop he had inherited from his late father. While Clifton enjoyed being a bachelor, his loving, but tart-tongued and opinionated mother Eloise "Mama" Curtis, played by Theresa Merritt, wanted him to settle down and find a nice wife. Additional characters – such as Clifton's two best friends—Earl, played by Teddy Wilson, an easy-going mailman and Junior, played by Ted Lange, a suave and good-humored ladies' man—came and went over the course of a typical day at Oscar's Barber Shop. Other characters included Tracy, Clifton's little sister, played by Lynne Moody and later by Joan Pringle and her husband, Leonard, played by Lisle Wilson, as well as local seniors Josh and Wildcat, played by DeForest Covan and Jester Hairston. Clifton Davis and Hairston would work together again years later in the hit sitcom, Amen.

The original name for That's My Mama was The Furst Family of Washington.  One year before the series debuted, ABC aired the pilot episode of this version, starring Merritt opposite Godfrey Cambridge as her son Oscar, as a one-off special.

That's My Mama Now!
In 1986, inspired by the success of What's Happening Now!!, Columbia Pictures Television produced a pilot for a sequel series called That's My Mama Now! with Ted Lange as the star. It lacked enough stations signing up to ensure revival.

Cast
 Clifton Davis as Clifton Curtis
 Theresa Merritt as Eloise "Mama" Curtis
 Ted Lange as Junior
 Theodore Wilson as Earl Chambers (season 1, episode 3 - season 2, episode 13, main)
 Jester Hairston as Wildcat (season 1, main)
 Lynne Moody as Tracy Curtis Taylor (season 1, main)
 DeForest Covan as Josh (season 1, main)
 Lisle Wilson as Leonard Taylor (season 2, main; recurring season 1)
 Joan Pringle as Tracy Curtis Taylor (season 2, main)
 Helen Martin as Laura (season 2, recurring)

Ernestine Wade originally portrayed the role of Laura in two episodes: "Clifton's Sugar Mama" (season 1, episode 5) and "The Birthday Party" (season 2, episode 1). Ed Bernard originated the role of Earl Chambers in the first two episodes of season 1: "Whose Child Is This?" and "Honesty Day". Teddy Wilson took over the role in episode 3 of season 1, and was added to the main cast. In addition, Wilson appeared as a different character in the pilot episode while Bernard portrayed the role of Earl in that episode.

Episodes

Season 1 (1974–1975)

Season 2 (1975)

Catchphrases

"Wooooooo, WHEE!! I got it, I got it, and I got to report it!"—Junior's (Ted Lange) introduction whenever he had a bit of juicy gossip to tell Clifton and anybody else in the barbershop who happened to be listening.

Home media
Sony Pictures Home Entertainment released both Seasons on DVD in Region 1 on August 23, 2005. The majority of episodes are presented on both DVD releases in their edited-for-syndication form. Only a handful of episodes are presented in their original unedited form.

On June 13, 2017, Sony Pictures Home Entertainment released That's My Mama- The Complete Series on DVD in Region 1.

Cultural reference
In the movie Coming to America, Eddie Murphy has a brief role as Randy Watson, who is explained by Arsenio Hall’s character, Reverend Brown, to have played “Joe the Policeman" in the (fictional) "What’s Going Down” episode of That's My Mama.

In the Family Guy episode "Mr. Griffin Goes to Washington," Peter testifies before Congress. Trying to think of a snappy line with which to end his speech, he finally quips "Well, that's my mama!"  (This was the tagline at the end of each That's My Mama episode's prologue.)

Syndicated Rebroadcast
Decades TV reran all 39 episodes of That's My Mama in their Weekend Binge programming for February 12-13, 2022.

References

External links
 
 That's My Mama at Super70s.com

1974 American television series debuts
1975 American television series endings
1970s American sitcoms
1970s American black sitcoms
American Broadcasting Company original programming
Television series about widowhood
Television series by Sony Pictures Television
Television shows set in Washington, D.C.